Phoenix is a South African town about 25 kilometres northwest of Durban Central, in KwaZulu-Natal, South Africa. It was established as a town by the apartheid government in 1976, but it has a long history of Indian occupation. It is associated with the Phoenix Settlement, built by Mahatma Gandhi.

In 2021, riots broke out in KwaZulu-Natal after the imprisonment of former president Jacob Zuma. The riots also occurred in Phoenix and armed citizen militias were formed. There were violent clashes between the community and rioter from nearby settlements like Inanda, which caused the deaths of 36 people and increased racial tensions between Indian and black communities in the area.

History
The township was founded initially as a sugarcane estate. After the passing of the Group Areas Act, a law which designated specific regions for occupation by specific races, Phoenix became an Indian township. Sections were initially labelled as precincts or units, and then later renamed with proper street addresses.

2021 KZN riots 

Following the imprisonment of former president Jacob Zuma for contempt of court, riots broke out in KwaZulu-Natal on July 9, 2021. Phoenix was among the towns affected. Shops were looted and property was vandalised. Due to a lack of police response during the riots, citizen militias formed to patrol the town and set up roadblocks to prevent rioters from entering the area and looters from absconding with stolen goods. Physical altercations then occurred between the Phoenix community and interlopers from the nearby predominantly black community of Inanda. Police Minister Bheki Cele claimed that 20 deaths happened in Phoenix as a result of such clashes. 

The riots exacerbated racial tensions between the Indian and black communities in the area, and led to accusations of racism at the Indian community by the black community.

Fake reports of further violence and killings sprung up on social networks in the aftermath. Following the unrest, supporters of Zuma marched to protest the Phoenix killings.

Places in Phoenix
Until the early 1990s, Phoenix was divided into 'units' by the local government. These units have since been given street and area names, such as:

 Brookdale (Unit 12)
 Grove End (Unit 17)
 Stanmore
 Eastbury (Unit 7)
 Southgate
 Greenbury (Unit 4)
 Furnham 
 Stonebridge (Unit 15)
 Centenary Park
 Campbellstown (Unit 5)
 Centenary Heights
 Rockford
 Clayfield 
 Longcroft (Unit 8)
 Rydalvale (Unit 9)
 Terrance Manor
 Shastri Park
 Palm View
 Caneside (Unit 20)
 Foresthaven (Unit 21)
 Woodview
 Rainham (Unit 2)
 Redfern 
 Whetstone (Unit 10)
 Rexham 
 Westham

However, many local people still refer to areas by their unit numbers.

There are many religious establishments such as masjids, temples and churches present in Phoenix.

Media and communication
Local news is distributed via regional newspapers such as the Rising Sun, the Post and Phoenix Tabloid, Daily News & Mercury, Sunday times  In terms of telecommunications and Internet access, 99% of Phoenix is covered by either wireless Internet connections such as 5G , 4G , LTE, UMTS, EDGE, and HSDPA, or have access to a landline/ADSL. The majority of ADSL users in Phoenix use Telkomsa as their Internet service provider.

There are also many local Facebook pages that are used to relay news and crime related incidents such as Grove end & Stanmore page on Facebook helping community.

Health and education
Public education in the Phoenix area is provided by various primary and secondary schools, one technikon and various FET colleges. There is one major government hospital (Mahatma Gandhi Memorial Hospital), and one private hospital (Mount Edgecombe Hospital). Various clinics are also to be found, e. g. Grove End Clinic.

List of schools in Phoenix:
 Wembley Primary School
 Natest Primary School 
 Mahathma Primary School
 Sunford Primary School
 Avonford Secondary School
 Solvista Secondary School
 Rustic Manor Primary School
 Stanmore Secondary & Primary School
 Grove End Secondary School
 Woodview Primary & Secondary School
 Highstone Primary School (Unit 11)
 Grandmore Primary School
 Palmview Primary School
 Riverview Primary School
 Olimpia Primary School
 Palmview Secondary School
 Sastripark Secondary School
 Northmead Secondary School (Unit 10)
 Phoenix Secondary School (Unit 5)
 Stonebridge Primary School (Unit 4)
 Pioneer Primary School (Unit 4)
 Daleview Secondary School (Unit 2)
 Greenbury Primary School (Unit 2)
 Greenbury Secondary School (Unit 2)
 Clayhaven Primary School (Unit 5)
 Hopeville Primary School (Unit 3)
 Northlen Primary School (Unit 13)
 Crystal Point Secondary School (Unit 13)
 Brookdale Secondary School (Unit 12)
 Trenance Manor Secondary School
 Millview Primary School (Unit 7)
 Eastbury Secondary School (Unit 7)
 Rydalvale Primary School (Unit 9)
 Rydalpark Secondary School (Unit 9)
 Havenpark Secondary School
 Foresthaven Secondary school
 Earlington Secondary School
 Brailsford Primary School
 Phoenix Technical Secondary School
 Whetstone Primary School (Unit 11)
 Clayheights Primary School (Unit 20)
 Redfern Primary School (Unit 10)
 Ferndale Combined School

Shopping centres
Phoenix Plaza, Gem City, Starwood Mall, The Acropolis mall and Top Hat supermarket, Checksave, Check Mart & some of the few shopping centres that can be found in Phoenix's CBD. These centres cater for various needs from top brand shops to local products.

Phoenix Plaza

Phoenix Plaza owned by Vukile Property Fund is a shopping centre situated north of Durban. The centre is home to more than 105 independent and national retailers with Shoprite as its anchor tenant.

The shopping centre totalling a gross lettable area of 24,341 m² was built in 1993.

Transport
Three main means of public transport are available: private owned buses, taxis and the rail system including Uber & Taxify. Phoenix has its own railway station which connects to many towns in Durban. The King Shaka International Airport is a short drive away, which provides various outlets. Totaling 175 at its peak in the mid-90s, Phoenix had one of the largest numbers of privately owned buses in South Africa. The two bus services that contributed to the transport landscape of the area were Mayville Coach Lines and Springfield Safari Tours (SOS).

Industrial sector
Phoenix also hosts a huge industrial area with big companies such as SAB Africa Miller, which produces beverages in the Coca-Cola family and many new Industrial company recently opened up

References

Populated places in eThekwini Metropolitan Municipality
Former Indian townships in South Africa
Townships in KwaZulu-Natal